COBUS Industries is a brand of airport buses manufactured by CaetanoBus, distributed by COBUS Industries, based in Wiesbaden, Germany.

Products
 COBUS 3000 (diesel)
 COBUS 2700S (diesel)
 e.COBUS (electric)
 COBUS Vega (electric)
 COBUS Hydra (fuel cell)

See also
 Ground support equipment

References

External links

 Cobus Industries website
 Cobus Industries LP

Bus manufacturers of Germany
Companies based in Wiesbaden
1978 establishments in West Germany
Vehicle manufacturing companies established in 1978
German companies established in 1978